Česvinica is a village in the municipality of Ston, Croatia.

References

Populated places in Dubrovnik-Neretva County